John L. Fage (born July→September 1935 in Wirral), an alumnus of St Edmund Hall, Oxford is a former British rower. Fage competed in the 1958 and 1959 Boat Races for Oxford, and was a member of the winners' team in the latter.

Representing Wales, John Fage competed in the 1958 British Empire and Commonwealth Games where he won a bronze medal.

References

Living people
1935 births
Oxford University Boat Club rowers
British male rowers
Rowers at the 1958 British Empire and Commonwealth Games
Commonwealth Games medallists in rowing
Commonwealth Games bronze medallists for England
Medallists at the 1958 British Empire and Commonwealth Games